Brian Lugo Silva (born January 5, 1991 in Montevideo, Uruguay) is a Uruguayan footballer currently playing for Deportes Concepción of the Primera División B in Chile.

Teams
  Nacional (Reserves) 2005-2009
  River Plate 2010-2011
  Emelec 2011-2012
  River Plate 2012-2013
  Operário Ferroviário 2013
  Villa Teresa 2014
  Deportes Concepción 2014–present

References
 
 

1991 births
Living people
Uruguayan footballers
Uruguayan expatriate footballers
Club Nacional de Football players
Club Atlético River Plate (Montevideo) players
Villa Teresa players
C.S. Emelec footballers
Deportes Concepción (Chile) footballers
Primera B de Chile players
Ecuadorian Serie A players
Expatriate footballers in Chile
Expatriate footballers in Brazil
Expatriate footballers in Ecuador
Association football midfielders